Mihai or Mihail Racoviță (c. 1660 – July 1744) was a Prince of Moldavia on three separate occasions (September 1703 – February 23, 1705; July 31, 1707 – October 28, 1709; January 5, 1716 – October 1726) and Prince of Wallachia on two occasions (between October 1730 and October 2, 1731, and from September 1741 until his death). His rules overlapped with the accession of Phanariotes in the Danubian Principalities – he is considered himself a Phanariote for the duration of his last rule in Moldavia and his rules over Wallachia.

Biography

First rules
A local boyar of the Racoviță House (and the father of Constantin Racoviță), closely related to the Cantacuzino family and the son-in-law of Constantin Cantemir, Mihai Racoviță was appointed ruler of Moldavia by Ahmed III, the Sultan of the Ottoman Empire, but had to continue fighting off other candidates for the throne, as well as their boyar supporters. To counter these, the Prince relied on Greek supporters: notably, his allies were the first members of the Rosetti family.

These conflicts brought an increase in taxation, as well as new fiscal demands. He was replaced by Antioh Cantemir, who, by contrast, was seen as an exceptional ruler. Again on the throne, Racoviță was deposed on orders from the Sultan, and recalled to Istanbul on pressures from Russia's Peter the Great; he was replaced by Nicholas Mavrocordatos.

He was returned to rule in Iași upon the outbreak of the Austro-Turkish War, given his image as an enemy of the Habsburg monarchy. When the Habsburg troops entered Moldavia, Racoviță suffered heavy losses, and called on help from the Nogai Tatars in Yedisan. Subsequently, he was able to defeat the infiltrating forces, and had the Habsburg commander executed together with those boyars who had risen against him.

Transylvanian campaign and late rules
He was ordered by the Ottomans to pass into Transylvania with Crimean Tatar assistance, where he was to help Francis II Rákóczi in his anti-Habsburg rebellion; his campaign met fierce Habsburg resistance in Bistrița, and his retreat was marked by another Habsburg invasion, as well as by the wide-scale plunder of boyar estates by the Nogais (allowed by Racoviță as payment for their participation in combat). After the incident, he was ousted from the Moldavian throne after his rival Mavrocordatos appealed to the Sultan, was jailed and replaced with Grigore II Ghica.

In 1726, Racoviță presided the Iași trial of four Jews from the Bessarabian borough of Onițcani, who stood accused of having ritually murdered a five-year-old child on Easter. The defendants were eventually acquitted following diplomatic protests (notably, the French ambassador to the Porte, Jean-Baptiste Louis Picon, remarked that such an accusation was no longer accepted in "civilized countries").

His ascension to the throne in Bucharest came in the context of Patrona Halil's Ottoman rebellion, which had toppled Ahmed III and brought Mahmud I as Sultan; Halil's downfall in the following year almost brought about Racoviță's, but he successfully furnished the Porte with income provided by raised taxes. He died in Istanbul.

Notes

References
Ion Neculce, Letopiseţul Ţării Moldovei, Chapters XV-XVIII, XXI
Andrei Oișteanu, "«Evreul imaginar» versus «Evreul real»" ("«The Imaginary Jew» Versus «The Real Jew»"), in Mythos & Logos, Editura Nemira, Bucharest, 1998, p. 175–263

Rulers of Moldavia
Rulers of Wallachia
Mihai
1744 deaths
18th-century Romanian people
Rulers of Moldavia and Wallachia
Year of birth missing
Place of birth missing